Ester Rachel Fuchs (born August 14, 1951) is an American academic. She is Professor of Public Affairs and Political Science at Columbia University’s School of International and Public Affairs. Fuchs studied at Queens College, CUNY, Brown University, and the University of Chicago.

She wrote Mayors and Money: Fiscal Policy in New York and Chicago, and describes herself as a "Pragmatic Utopian". Fuchs served as Special Advisor to the Mayor for Governance and Strategic Planning under New York City Mayor Michael Bloomberg from 2001 to 2005.

In 2005, Fuchs served as Chair of the New York City Charter Revision Commission. She currently serves as Director of WhosOnTheBallot.org, an online platform working to increase voter participation and education in New York City elections.

Among her notable students are Karine Jean-Pierre, current White House Press Secretary, who credited Fuchs' mentorship for inspiring her to get involved in politics.

Awards and honors
In 2017, Fuchs was awarded the Bella Abzug Leadership Award. She was the recipient of the NASPAA Public Service Matters Spotlight Award in 2014.

References

Living people
Queens College, City University of New York alumni
Brown University alumni
University of Chicago alumni
Columbia School of International and Public Affairs faculty
Place of birth missing (living people)
1951 births